KMAX-TV (channel 31) is a television station in Sacramento, California, United States, affiliated with The CW. It is owned by the CBS News and Stations group alongside Stockton-licensed CBS owned-and-operated station KOVR (channel 13). Both stations share studios on KOVR Drive in West Sacramento, while KMAX-TV's transmitter is located in Walnut Grove, California.

History
The station first signed on the air on October 5, 1974, as KMUV-TV, operating as an independent station. It originally operated from studio facilities located on Media Place in Sacramento. The station was originally owned by Sid Grayson and had carried an all-movie format to counter-program against the area's other established stations, particularly then-independent KTXL (channel 40, now a Fox affiliate). However, on May 1, 1976, KMUV abandoned its all-movie format and largely began to air Spanish-language programming, along with some English-language religious programs (such as The PTL Club).

On April 2, 1981, Koplar Broadcasting (then-owner and founder of St. Louis' KPLR-TV) purchased channel 31 and relaunched it on April 6 of that year under the callsign KRBK-TV (named for company founder Harold Koplar's son, Robert "Bob" Koplar), formatted as an English-language general entertainment independent to compete directly with KTXL.

Pappas Telecasting purchased the station in 1994 for $22 million. On January 11, 1995, the station changed its call letters to KPWB-TV (for Pappas WB) to reflect its affiliation with The WB Television Network, which launched the same day. Paramount Stations Group bought the station in March 1998, thus resulting in an affiliation swap with KQCA (channel 58) on January 5 of that year, that saw the UPN affiliation move to channel 31, which assumed the present call letters KMAX-TV, while The WB affiliation moved to KQCA. With Paramount's ownership stake in UPN, KMAX became the first English-language station in Sacramento to be owned and operated by a major network (Univision station KUVS-DT became the first television station in the market overall to be owned and operated by the network a year prior, but broadcasts in Spanish). Viacom acquired CBS in 1999, merging Paramount Stations Group with CBS' owned-and-operated stations to form the Viacom Television Stations Group.

Channel 31 was the flagship television home of the NBA's Sacramento Kings from the 1988–89 season until the middle of the 2002–03 season, when the team's owners, the Maloof family, terminated the station's contract due to the Kings forming their own sales and marketing departments and taking the ad sales "in house." KMAX remains the local over-the-air affiliate of the San Francisco Giants Major League Baseball franchise. It also held local broadcast rights to the Oakland Athletics before that team moved all its telecasts to regional sports network Comcast SportsNet California in 2009.

In May 2005, Viacom purchased KOVR from the Sinclair Broadcast Group, creating a duopoly with KMAX; KMAX's operations were also relocated to KOVR's studios in West Sacramento. Seven months later, Viacom divested itself of CBS due to the company's split into two separate entities (one of which retained the Viacom name); KOVR and KMAX, along with the other CBS and UPN stations operated by Viacom, became part of the newly formed CBS Corporation.

On January 24, 2006, CBS Corporation and Time Warner's Warner Bros. Entertainment (the division that operated The WB) announced that they would dissolve UPN and The WB, and move some of their programming to a newly created network, The CW. KMAX, as a CBS-owned UPN station, was tapped to become the market's affiliate of the new network through an 11-station affiliation deal, and became a charter affiliate of The CW on September 18, 2006. The station changed its on-air branding from "UPN 31" to "CW31" one month before The CW's September 18 launch to reflect this. As the Sacramento affiliate of The CW, KMAX-TV airs the Saturday morning educational One Magnificent Morning lineup on a four-hour delay, from 11:00 a.m. to 2:00 p.m. due to the Saturday edition of Good Day (it formerly aired until 4:00 p.m. until the block was cut by two hours in October 2017).

News operation

KMAX-TV presently broadcasts 40½ hours of locally produced newscasts each week (with 6½ hours each weekday and four hours each on Saturdays and Sundays). Combined with sister station KOVR, it has the highest local newscast output among Sacramento's broadcast television stations, producing 79½ hours of local newscasts. KMAX is also one of only five CW affiliates that produce a local newscast on weekend mornings, alongside WCCB in Charlotte, WPIX in New York City, WISH-TV in Indianapolis, and KTLA in Los Angeles. The station's morning newscast Good Day (which debuted in 1995 as The Morning Show, then later as Good Day Sacramento), consistently ranks as the Sacramento area's second highest-rated morning news program—among both local or network shows—behind Today on NBC affiliate KCRA-TV (channel 3). The station has also maintained a nightly newscast since the 1980s, titled 31 News (later 31 Action News and UPN 31 Action News); the nightly newscast was cancelled in 1998 due to low ratings. A midday edition of UPN 31 Action News continued to air until 2000, when it was also cancelled, leaving Good Day as the only news program at the time.

After Viacom's acquisition of KOVR, KMAX's news department was merged with KOVR, with reporters appearing on both stations and the Good Day Sacramento set being relocated into the KOVR studio facility. While it did hinder both stations at the time, KOVR and KMAX each produced a weekday morning news block from 5:00 to 7:00 a.m., though KMAX's morning newscast starts at 4:30 and ends at 11:00 a.m. (in 2020, KOVR dropped its own 5:00 to 7:00 a.m. newscast in favor of simulcasting Good Day). The station expanded its news programming in 2003 with a non-traditional late evening newscast called Good Evening Sacramento, this program was cancelled the following year.

On January 11, 2008, KOVR/KMAX management announced on a viewer blog that KOVR would begin producing a prime time newscast on KMAX-TV. However, owing to cutbacks ordered by CBS corporate management, plans for this broadcast were shelved in late summer 2008. On June 1, 2009, KMAX-TV began broadcasting Good Day Sacramento in high definition; footage shot in-studio is broadcast in high definition, while all news video from on-remote locations was initially broadcast in standard definition. Both KMAX-TV and KOVR currently utilize high-definition cameras for field reports, and most (if not all) vehicles transmit back high-definition video.

On June 4, 2012, KMAX-TV debuted a half-hour weeknight newscast produced by KOVR at 11 p.m., becoming the station's first traditional evening newscast in over a decade since the 1998 cancellation of its earlier prime time newscast; unlike most CW affiliates, the program broadcasts in the traditional late evening news timeslot of 11 p.m., due to KOVR's hour-long newscast at 10 p.m. On March 14, 2016, KMAX-TV added a half-hour weeknight KOVR-produced newscast at 6:30 p.m. to compete with KCRA's long-established 6:30 p.m. newscast. These newscasts, along with Good Day, are translated into Spanish via the station's SAP audio feed. On July 30, 2018, the 11 p.m. newscast was relocated to KOVR, leaving its 6:30 p.m. newscast as the only evening newscast. On September 27, 2021, the 6:30 p.m. newscast was relocated to KOVR an hour earlier at 5:30 p.m., competing with KTXL and ending that station's status as the only local newscast in the 5:30 p.m. timeslot. The change marked the end of evening newscasts altogether on KMAX for the second time in the station's history and Good Day would become the station's only news program once again.

After sister station KOVR purchased the "CBS 13 Mobile Weather Lab" and "Mobile13" mobile news vehicles in 2014, the station acquired a "Rover" mobile news vehicle in 2015. The "Good Day Rover" and "Mobile13" use a roof mounted robotic camera, various interior cameras, microphones, and a "LIVEU" mobile video broadcast system to transmit live video via mobile broadband connections. Good Day uses the Rover in the early hours of the morning to cover traffic and spot news.

In 2022, along with KOVR, Good Day from 4:30 to 7:00 a.m. weekday mornings was rebranded as CBS 13 Mornings (in reference to the national CBS Mornings program), with Good Day continuing to maintain its morning news program from 7:00 to 11:00 a.m. seven days a week.

Notable former on-air staff
 Mark S. Allen (1996–2015 as weekday morning entertainment reporter; also host of Mark at the Movies; now at KXTV)
 Christine Craft (1985–1990 as anchor; known for her lawsuit against previous employer Metromedia; now a fill-in talk host on KGO-AM in San Francisco)
 Sharon Ito (1993–1996 as anchor; later at KXTV)
 Grant Napear (1987–1995 as sports anchor; formerly at KHTK and also the former play-by-play announcer for the Sacramento Kings)
 Kinsey Schofield (2017 as anchor and reporter)

Technical information

Subchannels
The station's digital signal is multiplexed:

Analog-to-digital conversion
KMAX-TV shut down its analog signal, over UHF channel 31, on June 12, 2009, as part of the federally mandated transition from analog to digital television. The station's digital signal remained on its pre-transition UHF channel 21, using PSIP to display KMAX-TV's virtual channel as 31 on digital television receivers.

See also
Channel 24 digital TV stations in the United States
Channel 31 virtual TV stations in the United States

References

External links

Good Day Sacramento website

CBS News and Stations
The CW affiliates
Laff (TV network) affiliates
Comet (TV network) affiliates
Charge! (TV network) affiliates
Start TV affiliates
MAX-TV
Television channels and stations established in 1974
West Sacramento, California